Olinthus Gilbert Gregory (29 January 17742 February 1841) was an English mathematician, author, and editor.

Biography
He was born on 29 January 1774 at Yaxley in Huntingdonshire, the son of Robert, a shoemaker, and Ann, who also had three younger daughters: Harriet Euphrasia, Sophia (who died in 1783) and Marianna.

Having been educated by Richard Weston, a Leicester botanist, Olinthus published a treatise, Lessons, Astronomical and Philosophical in 1793. After moving to Cambridge in 1796, Gregory first acted as sub-editor on the Cambridge Intelligencer, and then opened a booksellers shop.

In 1802 he obtained an appointment as mathematical master at the Royal Military Academy, Woolwich through the influence of Charles Hutton, to whose notice he had been brought by a manuscript on the Use of the Sliding Rule; and when Hutton resigned in 1807 Gregory succeeded him in the professorship.

Gregory combined his love of mathematics with an interest in music, but not in the melodious sense: music should be subject to rational principles. He proposed “the substitution of proper characters to denote the different kinds of musical time, instead of those vague indefinite ones, which are now in use.” No more 3/2 time, or Adagio and Allegro; rather, some absolute rate, based on the swing of a precisely-calibrated pendulum. Each composition should be played at its pre-defined speed, no matter who was conducting. In discussing Gregory's ideas, Werrett draws attention to the environment at Woolwich in which he developed them, and the use of the metronome to maintain a consistent rhythm in military music.

Gregory favoured the establishment of a secular university in London. By the end of 1825 he was on a ten-man committee interviewing and selecting the teaching staff. His name was inscribed on the foundation stone of the new University, laid in Gower Street on 30 April 1827.

Failing health obliged him to retire in 1838, and he died at his home at Queen's Terrace, Woolwich on 2 February 1841. Gregory's library was sold on 17 & 18 March 1842 by Southgate & Son of 22 Fleet Street.

The esteem in which Dr Gregory was held can be judged from the following letter in 1841:

To the Editor of the Morning Chronicle.
Sir - I see by your paper of the 11th inst., that Doctor Olinthus Gregory, late Professor Mathematics, &c. &c.,
Royal Miltary Academy, Woolwich, has left his widow and family in any thing but affluent circumstances.
Now, I do trust, that out of the number of people who have experienced his exertions, as a Professor at
the Royal Miltary Academy, and also have benefitted by him as highly scientific individual, there may be
found some who will subscribe to the benefit of the widow and family of that excellent man.
I remain, sir,
C. D., M.P.,
One of Dr. O. G.'s pupils at the R.M.Ac., Woolwich
Edinburgh, Feb. 13.

Affiliations
Many in this list are cited in the University of St Andrews website.

Corresponding Associate of the Academy of Dijon
Honorary Member of the Literary and Philosophical Society of New York
Member of the New-York Historical Society
Member of the Literary and Philosophical, and the Antiquarian Societies of Newcastle upon Tyne
Member of the Cambridge Philosophical Society
Member of the Institution of Civil Engineers
Founder member, and later Secretary, of the Astronomical Society
Professor Mathematics in the Royal Military Academy, Woolwich
Co-founder and first president of the Woolwich Institution for the Advancement of Literary, Scientific and Technical Knowledge

In 1802 Gregory was appointed editor of the Gentlemen's Diary, and from 1819 to 1840 editor of the Lady's Diary. From 1817, “he had the whole of the general superintendence of the almanacks published by the Stationers’ Company.”

Family
Gregory married, first, Rebecca Marshall on 4 March 1798 in Yaxley, with whom he had a son James and a daughter Eliza; Rebecca died in June 1807.  His second marriage was to Anne Beddome on 20 December 1809 at St Mary, Newington, with whom he had two sons and a daughter. Their elder son, Boswell Robert was accidentally drowned in the Thames at Woolwich in the summer of 1834, aged 21. Letitia Elizabeth Landon includes a poetical illustration, to a portrait by Richard Evans,  commiserating with this event in Fisher's Drawing Room Scrap Book, 1835. Their second son, Charles Hutton Gregory, who later became president of the Institution of Civil Engineers, was named after Charles Hutton, Gregory's patron.

Anne died in Paddington in 1855, aged 65, and was buried at St Nicholas, Plumstead.

Works

References

Notes

1774 births
1841 deaths
18th-century English mathematicians
19th-century English mathematicians
19th-century British astronomers
Academics of the Royal Military Academy, Woolwich
People from Yaxley, Cambridgeshire
Evangelical Anglicans
English encyclopedists
Writers about religion and science
Committee members of the Society for the Diffusion of Useful Knowledge